Cabralea is a genus of trees in the family Meliaceae. It has one species, Cabralea canjerana. It is dioecious, with male and female flowers on separate plants.

Taxonomy 
Cabralea canjerana currently has 3 accepted subspecies:
 subsp. canjerana – Costa Rica to Brazil and NE Argentina
 subsp. polytricha (A.Juss.) T.D.Penn. – Brazil
 subsp. selloi (C.DC.) Barreiros – Brazil

References 

Meliaceae
Monotypic Sapindales genera
Trees of Argentina
Trees of Bolivia
Trees of Brazil
Trees of Colombia
Trees of Costa Rica
Trees of Ecuador
Trees of Guyana
Trees of Paraguay
Trees of Peru
Trees of Venezuela
Taxa named by Carl Friedrich Philipp von Martius
Neotropical realm flora
Meliaceae genera
Dioecious plants